Charles Baldwin (29 December 1864 – 2 May 1947) was an English cricketer. He played 80 first-class matches for Surrey between 1892 and 1898.

See also
 List of Surrey County Cricket Club players

References

External links
 

1864 births
1947 deaths
English cricketers
Surrey cricketers
Sportspeople from Bury St Edmunds
Suffolk cricketers